Victor Pace (3 May 1907 – 15 August 2000) was a Maltese water polo player. He competed in the men's tournament at the 1928 Summer Olympics.

References

External links
 

1907 births
2000 deaths
Maltese male water polo players
Olympic water polo players of Malta
Water polo players at the 1928 Summer Olympics
Place of birth missing